Skepsis ry or the Finnish Association of Skeptics is a Finnish scientific skepticism organization founded in 1987.

Purpose 
Its mission is to promote objective, impartial and critical investigation of paranormal claims and pseudoscience. Skepsis ry organizes public lectures and publishes articles and books related to skepticism, including a quarterly magazine Skeptikko. Skepsis ry works in collaboration with other scientific skepticism organizations and is a member of the European Council of Skeptical Organisations (ECSO). Skepsis ry is known for its annual Huuhaa ("humbug") Prize which is awarded to a person or an organization that has diligently promoted pseudo- or fringe science, and for its Socrates Prize which is awarded for work promoting Socratic, rational thinking. Skepsis ry also offers a prize of €10,000, sponsored by the astronomer Hannu Karttunen and the magician Iiro Seppänen, to anybody in Finland who can produce paranormal phenomena under satisfactory observing conditions. The same sum is also offered as an ET scholarship to anyone who can prove that she/he/it is an extraterrestrial by providing a DNA (or equivalent) sample for investigation.

Huuhaa Prize 
The Huuhaa Prize has been given annually by Skepsis since 1989 to a person or an organization who has actively promoted pseudoscience. The recipients since 2004 are the following:
2004: Helsinki University of Technology's (nowadays Aalto University) Bioprocess Engineering Laboratory for presenting creationism as a natural science seminar 
2005: The folk high school of Varsinais-Suomi for including pseudoscientific topics in its curriculum
2006: All those pharmacies and pharmacy organizations who promote the sales of homeopathic products and offer them as alternatives for science-based medicine
2007: Suomen Kinesiologiayhdistys ry (a Finnish kinesiology association) for successfully promoting applied kinesiology
2008: Publisher Uusi Tie for promulgating pseudoscience by publishing books by Finnish intelligent design supporter Tapio Puolimatka
2009: Rokotusinfo ry for promoting one-sided and pseudoscientific claims on vaccines
2010: The Power Balance bracelet and its Finnish importers and retailers 
2011: Kärkkäinen retail store for publishing the free weekly newspaper Magneettimedia that promotes pseudoscience and conspiracy theories 
2012: Valkee Oy (a Finnish company) for successfully marketing a poorly researched bright light headset which they claim cures a multitude of symptoms such as jet lag, migraine and seasonal affective disorder
2013: GMO-Vapaa Suomi, a non-governmental organization promoting the ban of GMO crops from Finland. The price was given for twisting scientific knowledge and their fear-mongering style of discussion.
2014: Suomen Terveysjärjestö for divulging misleading information about health issues such as nutrition, vaccination and homeopathy

Socrates Prize 
The group's Socrates Prize is given annually to a person or an organization who has actively promoted rational thinking or public understanding of science. Recipients include:

2007: Docent Marjaana Lindeman and her research team for promoting critical thinking
2008: Journalist Kirsi Virtanen for promoting critical thinking in her radio programs
2009: Academy professor Kari Enqvist for promoting the public understanding of science
2010: Professor, astronomer and author Esko Valtaoja for meritorious promotion of a scientific worldview

Chairs 
 Otto Mäkelä 2013–
 Pertti Laine 2008–2012
 Matias Aunola 2004–2007
 Jukka Häkkinen 1999–2003
 Ilpo V. Salmi 1995–1998
 Veli Toukomies 1994
 Lauri Gröhn 1993 
 Nils Mustelin 1989–1992
 S. Albert Kivinen 1987–1989

References

External links 
 Official website
 Official YouTube channel

Skeptic organisations in Finland
Non-profit organisations based in Finland
Organizations established in 1987
Prizes for proof of paranormal phenomena